The Aeroprakt A-32 is a Ukrainian two-seat, high-wing, tricycle gear ultralight aircraft that was designed by Yuri Yakovlev and is manufactured by Aeroprakt. In Australia the A-32 is referred to as the Vixxen.

The A-32 is a development of the A-22 Foxbat; however unlike the earlier aircraft, which can be purchased in kit form or fully assembled, the A-32 Vixxen is supplied only as a kit in the UK, or ready-to-fly factory-built aircraft in 31 other countries

Design and development
The A-32 was developed from A-22 Foxbat during three years of research and development.

To increase cruise speed while employing the same  Rotax 912ULS engine as the A-22, the A-32 has a new flush wing-to-body fairing design and all flying horizontal stabilizer, as well as moulded baffling for improved engine airflow and cooling. Other changes include a wing that is  shorter, shorter lift struts and better wing tank fairing. This results in a cruise speed that is  faster than the A-22.

The prototype A-32 was completed in January 2014 and the first production aircraft was shown in April 2015. It was then transported to Australia, first flying at Moorabbin on 20 July 2015.

Variants 
Aeroprakt A-32L
An ultralight variant of the A-32 with a MTOW of 450 kg (or 472.5 kg with recovery parachute system) to comply with European regulations, although not UK legal. Central control Y-stick installed as default, twin control yokes offered as an option.

Specifications (A-32 Vixxen)

References

External links 

2010s Ukrainian ultralight aircraft
Aeroprakt aircraft
Single-engined tractor aircraft
High-wing aircraft